Vasiliki Papathanasiou (born 23 August 1949), generally known as Vicky Leandros, is a Greek singer living in Germany. She is the daughter of singer, musician and composer Leandros Papathanasiou (also known as Leo Leandros as well as Mario Panas). In 1967 she achieved worldwide fame after gaining fourth place for the country of Luxembourg in the Eurovision Song Contest with the song "L'amour est bleu", which became a worldwide hit. She further established her career by winning the Eurovision Song Contest in  1972 with the song "Après Toi", again representing Luxembourg.

On 15 October 2006, Vicky Leandros was elected town councillor of the Greek harbour town of Piraeus on the Pasok list. Her task concerned the Cultural and International development of Piraeus. She was also Deputy Mayor of Piraeus.
It was announced in June 2008 that Leandros decided to leave her position in Greek politics with immediate effect stating that she had underestimated the work load and time needed to fulfil her political obligations and that it had become impossible to combine those duties with her singing career.

Early career

Leandros was born as Vasiliki Papathanasiou in Palaiokastritsa, Corfu. Her father wanted to expand his career and went to West Germany while she grew up at her grandmother's house until the age of eight. In 1958 her parents took her to West Germany where she stayed with her father permanently after her parents' divorce. She revealed her talent at a young age while taking guitar, music, dance, ballet and voice lessons. 

In 1965, she released her first single "Messer, Gabel, Schere, Licht". This was the beginning of a successful career for her with her father as composer, manager and producer. In 1967 she received an offer to sing for Luxembourg at the Eurovision Song Contest with the song "L'amour est bleu". She finished in fourth place but the song became one of the biggest worldwide hits of the year and was covered by other artists. She was shortly singing in eight languages with her albums, singles and EPs being sold all over the world.

The 1970s

In 1970 her first TV show Ich Bin was broadcast in 13 European countries. It received many awards for its originality and thought-provoking contemporary graphics including in 1971 the world-famous Bronze Rose of Montreux. It was also the first time that Vicky used the same stage surname as her father (actually his real Christian name) and became known from then onwards as Vicky Leandros having been known simply as Vicky during the 1960s. Guests appearing were Julien Clerc and Deep Purple. The show has been repeated over the years and is seen as a classic piece very evocative of the era though at first it was not well received in all quarters owing to its surprising even shocking imagery in an age when songs were not generally accompanied by visuals for marketing purposes. Throughout the 1970s other film portraits by prominent film makers were to follow which attracted interest around the world. She later went on to host a television series in the UK for the BBC, entitled Music My Way.

In 1972 she represented Luxembourg at Eurovision for the second time and won the contest with the song "Après Toi".  Translated into English as "Come What May" it was also a hit in the UK reaching #2 on the UK Singles Chart. The song peaked at number 23 in Australia. Globally it sold over six million copies, and was awarded a gold disc. Leandros recorded the song in seven languages. Later in the year she released her version of the Theodorakis composition "O Kaymos (Sorrow, in Greek: Καημός) (The Love in Your Eyes)" which became a hit all over the world in various language versions. It peaked at #40 in the UK Singles Chart. In 1973 "When Bouzoukis Played" became another massive selling world hit in several languages reaching #44 in the UK chart. and 45 in Australia. In 1974 she recorded "Theo, wir fahr'n nach Lodz" a song that was a #1 hit in Germany. She also found much success in South Africa during the 1970s.

In Japan she reached her peak during the late 1960s and early 1970s and recorded many times in Japanese. Her second Japanese single "Watashi no Sukina Chocolate" (The Chocolate That I Like) became a notable hit. She also recorded many cover versions of songs, "Mamy Blue", "You Don't Have To Say You Love Me" and "My Sweet Lord" among others.

In 1975 she recorded the album entitled Across the Water in Nashville, Tennessee, and Miami, Florida. A departure from her previous works by combining country, rock, and soul The release was well received by critics upon its release in the United States. In 1976 she signed a multimillion-dollar contract with CBS Records for albums to be released in the US market and started working in Hollywood California with Kim Fowley but soon returned to Europe after CBS' support faltered.

After returning to Europe Leandros released albums of various genres which included German folk music and Christmas songs. Her career showed signs of fading and she had her last top 20 hit in Germany with the song Kali Nichta. She recorded an album in Spanish-language that gained her attention in Latin America. The first single, "Oh Mi Mama", was a minor hit, but the second single "Tu Me Has Hecho Sentir” although not promoted by Leandros or CBS due to differences between the two and a reported health scare, was a big hit in Spanish-speaking countries in 1979. It regularly appears on compilation albums and is easily the most famous and remembered song by Vicky Leandros in Spanish. A new album, Wie am Allerersten Tag went unreleased and Leandros became pregnant and took time off over the next 18 months.

The 1980s

In 1981 she recorded the album Love is Alive including duets with Demis Roussos, Johnny Hallyday and US star David Soul for a United Nations Benefit. Also in 1981 she released the album Ich gehe neue Wege and its Greek version, Irtha Yia Sena. This comeback was consolidated in 1982 by the success of the song "Verlorenes Paradies" from the same titled next album which saw Leandros back in the upper reaches of the singles charts in many territories after a few years absence. It was also recorded in Dutch.

In 1983 came the album Vicky containing the popular song and single "Grüße an Sarah" which is regularly still sung in concerts often a cappella with the other musicians and vocalists making the sounds of the beats and instruments vocally to combine with Leandros' main vocal. Later in 1983 she recorded again in Dutch a song specially for the Dutch-speaking market; "Ver van het leven". In 1984 the French version - "A l'Est d'Eden" - was a big success in France reaching #2 on the singles chart. This single and corresponding album (Vicky) gave Leandros a notable comeback in Canada and she toured there after a gap of many years in 1985. Two more single releases from the album also became Canadian hits - "Tu as sept Ponts a traverser" and "Salut bien Sarah" the French version of "Gruesse an Sarah".

In 1986 following her 1985 album entitled Eine Nacht in Griechenland Leandros again took time off to concentrate on her private life. The album achieved Gold status in the Benelux and German speaking countries. It was early 1988 before the next album, "Ich bin ich", would be released. Working with Klaus "Nick" Munro, the album contained many new rhythms and was more rock- oriented than previous works. Leandros did not tour and made very limited appearances during this period concentrating mainly on her family life and her three young children. Nevertheless, two singles were released from the album "Du hast schon laengst Goodbye gesagt" and "Oh Oh Oh" in a remixed version. In 1989 she returned to her music career in Greece and charted with her comeback album Piretos tou Erota.

The 1990s

In 1990 Leandros released the album "Starkes Gefühl" (Strong Feeling) which notably contained a new version of "Apres Toi" her Eurovision song contest winner of 1972. The album also contained the German version of “Piretos tou erota” now "Süchtig nach Geborgenheit" which was the first single cut. The early 1990s saw her scoring successful albums in Greece with "Prosexe" (1991), "Andres" (1993), and in Germany with the singles  "Du Bist Mein Schönster Gedanke" (1994), and a duet with Tony Christie, "We're Gonna Stay Together" (1995).

The resurgence of popularity in Greece saw first the re-release on vinyl of Leandros' early albums (with different sleeves) and later a CD release of them all with bonus tracks. From 1995 to 1998 she collaborated with German hit-maker Jack White and released three Top-10 albums as well as the German version of the Titanic song "My Heart Will Go On". This song "Weil mein Herz dich nie mehr vergisst" gave Leandros her highest-charting record since Verlorenes Paradies in 1982.

The 2000s

In 2000 Leandros started producing her own records. The album Jetzt / Now was a success and her own compositions received critical praise. Her duet with Chris De Burgh was one of the highlights of the album. Following this she featured again on the charts of several countries such as Canada, China, Japan, Belgium and South Africa due to the many greatest hits collections that several companies released.

In 2003 she recorded a new album Tragoudi Alliotiko with songs by Mikis Theodorakis accompanied by the Kamerata Orchestra under Theodorakis's supervision. The album became a success in Germany, central Europe and in Greece. TV stations and tabloid newspaper reviewers celebrated her comeback while other publications and reviewers questioned the rationale behind Leandros' performance of songs from a political composer like Theodorakis. Around this time she appeared in many TV shows on German and Greek television including galas with José Carreras. The album made it to the 100 best selling records of 2003, and Theodorakis wrote that he considered her "among the two or three most important interpreters of [my] work".

In 2003, she received two prestigious awards from the Greek government for her promotion of Greek culture and music abroad and another from the Greek Orthodox Church for her work for poor children in Africa. The latter award was presented to her at her classical concert held at the Herod Atticus amphitheatre in October 2003 and is the highest honour that the Greek Orthodox church can bestow. Leandros is the only woman to date to be awarded such an honor. 2005 saw the release of a double album Ich Bin Wie Ich Bin containing new recordings of her songs. The album charted in Germany, Austria and Switzerland. Her Jubilee Tour of Europe started in February 2006. A month later she took part in the German pre-selection for the Eurovision Song Contest 34 years since "Après Toi". Her song "Don't Break My Heart" which had already entered the charts failed to win the most votes from the televoting public.

Leandros released a CD in March 2009 titled Möge der Himmel. This album contained soul elements combined with some R&B flavour, hip hop and rap. The change in direction was headline news and the album received mixed reviews.

Recent career

The next album Zeitlos in 2010 returned to the idea born in 2008 of recording a collection of French songs and World hits in the German language. In 2011, she re-recorded her hit "L'amour est bleu" as "C'est Bleu" for the Scooter album The Big Mash Up. The unusual collaboration was named a highlight of the record and was released as a single on 2 December 2011. A new studio album with the title “Ich weiss, dass ich nichts weiss” was released on the Ariola (Sony) label in 2015 . The majority of the tracks contained were co-composed (music and lyrics) by Leandros. The themes of the songs are based to some extent on personal life experiences of the singer.

Personal life

From 1982 to 1986, Leandros was married to Greek entrepreneur Ivan Zissiadis, the father of her son, Leandros Zissiadis (born 6 June 1980). She married Enno von Ruffin, son of Freiherr Franz von Ruffin in May 1986. Enno von Ruffin has owned and managed his country estate, Gut Basthorst, since 1982. In 2005, Leandros and Enno separated after 19 years of marriage. The couple has two daughters: Maximiliane von Ruffin ("Milana"; born 31 January 1985) and Alessandra von Ruffin ("Sandra"; born 2 December 1986).

Awards and collaborations

Leandros has received various awards including gold and platinum records from all around the world for discs that have sold in excess of 150 million copies.
She worked with many composers, producers and conductors. She was awarded with the "Bronze Rose of Montreux", "Goldene Europa", "Record Award of USA", and "Song Statue of Japan".

 1967: Fourth place at the Eurovision with the song „L´amour est bleu“
 1968: Goldene Europa
 1971: Bronze Rose von Montreux for the TV-Show "Ich bin"
 1971: Bronze Lion of the Radio Luxembourg
 1972: First Place at the Eurovision with the song "Aprés toi“
 1972: Best Selling Artist Internationally
 1974: Goldene Europa
 2001: Goldene Stimmgabel German pop
 2001: Internationaler Schlagerpreis in the category of „Beste Künstlerin International“
 2003: Hospitality Zeus
 2005: Woman of the year in Greece
 2009: Orinocoradio bubbling after hitsong "Theo wir fahr'n nach Lodz"
 2011: Commander of the Order of Merit of the Grand Duchy of Luxembourg
 2018: Orinocoradio bubbling after hitsong "Verloren zijn wij niet"

Discography

References

External links

 

Year of birth uncertain
Living people
English-language singers from Germany
English-language singers from Greece
Eurovision Song Contest entrants of 1967
Eurovision Song Contest entrants of 1972
Eurovision Song Contest winners
French-language singers
Greek emigrants to Germany
20th-century German women singers
20th-century Greek women singers
Schlager musicians
Greek pop singers
20th-century Greek women politicians
Eurovision Song Contest entrants for Luxembourg
Philips Records artists
Musicians from Corfu
Musicians from Hamburg
PASOK politicians
Recipients of the Cross of the Order of Merit of the Federal Republic of Germany
1949 births
German baronesses
Commanders of the Order of Merit of the Grand Duchy of Luxembourg